The Tree of Life: Original Motion Picture Soundtrack is the official soundtrack album for the 2011 drama film The Tree of Life directed by Terrence Malick. Composed by Alexandre Desplat, the soundtrack was released by Lakeshore Records on May 24, 2011.

Although billed as the film's soundtrack, only a few minutes of this album are found in the film. The film and its teaser trailer also includes pieces of music such as the Vltava (also known as the Moldau) of Bedřich Smetana and Ottorino Respighi's Ancient Airs and Dances Suite No. 3.

Track listing

References

External links 

Album review at movie-wave.net
The Tree of Life soundtrack review
Official film website

2011 soundtrack albums
Drama film soundtracks
Alexandre Desplat soundtracks